Castro Verde e Casével is a civil parish in the municipality of Castro Verde, Portugal. It was formed in 2013 by the merger of the former parishes Castro Verde and Casével. The population in 2011 was 5,346, in an area of 322.77 km2.

References

Freguesias of Castro Verde